Luis Juan Tomé (July 19, 1914 - September 25, 1981) was a prelate of the Roman Catholic Church. He served as bishop of Mercedes from 1963 till his death in 1981.

Life 
Born in Buenos Aires, Tomé was ordained to the priesthood on April 16, 1938, serving in the archdiocese of Buenos Aires.

On July 26, 1963, he was appointed bishop of Mercedes. Tomé received his episcopal consecration on the following September 15 from Antonio Cardinal Caggiano, archbishop of Buenos Aires, with the archbishop of Tucumán, Juan Carlos Aramburu, who would later become a cardinal, and the bishop of Rosario, Guillermo Bolatti, serving as co-consecrators.

Tomé was a council father at the second, third and fourth session of the Second Vatican Council.

He died on September 25, 1981.

References

External links 
 Entry about Luis Juan Tomé at catholic-hierarchy.org

1914 births
1981 deaths
20th-century Roman Catholic bishops in Argentina
Roman Catholic bishops of Mercedes-Luján